Paul Duffie (born June 14, 1951) is a Canadian former politician, lawyer and judge in the province of New Brunswick. Duffie was born in Neguac, New Brunswick. A graduate of Ricker College in Houlton, Maine with a Bachelor of Science degree and the University of New Brunswick in Fredericton, New Brunswick with a law degree. He was mayor of Grand Falls from 1986 until his election as MLA in 1987.

Elected as a Liberal in the Frank McKenna landslide, Duffie continued his law practice in addition to his legislative duties. In 1991, he was named to the board of governors for the University of New Brunswick.

In 1991, Duffie was re-elected as MLA and appointed to be the Minister of Education.  He became Minister of Municipalities, Culture & Housing in 1994.  Upon being re-elected in 1995 he became Minister of Justice.

Duffie resigned from cabinet in 1997, after considering a run for leader, to spend more time with his family.  Duffie co-chaired the leadership campaign of Camille Theriault with Doug Tyler.

Duffie did not seek re-election in the 1999 general election.

In 2001, following the resignation of Theriault, Duffie was encouraged to run for leader.  His biggest supporters in the small, seven member, Liberal caucus of the day were House Leader Eric Allaby and former Minister of Transportation Sheldon Lee.

In early 2002, Shawn Graham emerged as the clear leader in delegate selection meetings and Duffie dropped out of the race, backing Graham.

Though he originally pledged to run in the coming election, he backed fellow Liberal and fellow former Grand Falls mayor Ron Ouellette who was elected on June 9, 2003.

Duffie was re-elected mayor of Grand Falls on May 10, 2004, 18 years after he was first elected to the post.

In June 2008, he was named a provincial court judge.

Notes

References 
 Entry from Canadian Who's Who

1951 births
Living people
Ricker College alumni
University of New Brunswick alumni
Lawyers in New Brunswick
New Brunswick Liberal Association MLAs
Members of the Executive Council of New Brunswick
Mayors of places in New Brunswick
University of New Brunswick Faculty of Law alumni